Cyprus Science University was founded in 2013  by the Özok company. It is accredited by YÖK, the Higher Education Council of Turkeyl; and YÖDAK, the Higher Education Planning, Evaluation, Accreditation and coordination Council of Northern Cyprus; but not yet by any international accrediting agency. Lale Ayşegül BÜYÜKGÖNENÇ is the Acting Rector.

Campus 

The campus is located near the city of Kyrenia, in the Kazafani (Ozanköy) area and consists of two buildings and a basketball court.

Faculties
Faculty of Engineering
Electrical and Electronic Engineering (EN)
Mechatronics Engineering (EN)
Computer and Software Engineering (EN)
Software Engineering (EN)
Information Security Engineering (EN)

Faculty of Economic, Administrative and Social Sciences
Business Administration (EN / TR)
Civil Aviation Management (TR)
Banking and Finance (EN)
International Relations (EN)
Psychology (EN / TR)

Faculty of Law 
Law (TR)
International law (EN)

Faculty of Educational Sciences
Guidance and Psychological Counseling (TR)
Special Needs Education (TR)
Turkish Teaching (TR)

Faculty of Health Sciences
Physiotherapy and Rehabilitation (TR)
Nursing (EN / TR)

Faculty of Fine Arts and Design
Architecture (EN)
Interior Architecture and Environmental Design (TR)

Faculty of Tourism
Tourism and Hotel Management (EN)

References

Universities and colleges in Cyprus